James Bond 007 is horizontally scrolling shooter published in 1983 by Parker Brothers for the Atari 2600, Atari 5200, Atari 8-bit family, Commodore 64, and ColecoVision. It was distributed in Japan by Tsukuda Original for the SG-1000. It was the first video game based on James Bond to be given a worldwide release.

Gameplay

The player controls James Bond across four levels. The player is given a multi-purpose vehicle that acts as an automobile, a plane, and a submarine. The vehicle can fire shots and flare bombs, and travels from left to right as the player progresses through each level. The player can shoot or avoid enemies and obstacles that appear throughout the game, including boats, frogmen, helicopters, missiles, and mini-submarines.

The game's four levels are loosely based on missions from James Bond films:
Diamonds are Forever (1971): The player rescues Tiffany Case from an oil rig.
The Spy Who Loved Me (1977): The player destroys an underwater laboratory.
Moonraker (1979): The player destroys satellites.
For Your Eyes Only (1981): The player retrieves radio equipment from a sunken boat.

Development
Initially, Charlie Heath worked on a demo version of the game that was based on the final scene in Moonraker, which failed to impress Parker Brothers. Heath left Parker Brothers in late 1982, and no copies of his version exist. In 1983, a new version of the game, titled James Bond 007 As Seen in Octopussy, was in development by Western Technologies, with a scheduled release later that summer. The game was to be based on the 1983 Bond film, Octopussy, and would have included a train sequence from the film. Western Technologies failed to complete the game, and Parker Brothers subsequently hired On Time Software to create an entirely new game.

Reception
Computer Games gave the Atari 8-bit family version an "A" rating and noted the "simple" graphics and sound, and the lack of a high-score display, but praised the diversity of the game's missions and weapons, writing that they make the game "an exceptionally challenging shoot-em-up. It's also interesting to have a definite purpose at the end of each mission, instead of simply shooting everything that moves."

In a retrospective review, AllGame's Brett Alan Weiss gave the ColecoVision version two stars out of five. He wrote that the game "has so many flaws that it is easily the worst cartridge in the Parker Brothers library of ColecoVision titles." Weiss criticized the game's sound effects, its difficult controls and gameplay, its short length, and most of its graphics, but wrote that it gradually and briefly becomes enjoyable once the controls have been mastered.

See also
 Outline of James Bond

References

External links
James Bond 007 for the Atari 8-bit family at Atari Mania
James Bond 007 for the Atari 2600 at Atari Mania

1983 video games
Atari 2600 games
Atari 5200 games
Atari 8-bit family games
ColecoVision games
Commodore 64 games
Horizontally scrolling shooters
SG-1000 games
James Bond video games
Parker Brothers video games
Moonraker (film)
For Your Eyes Only (film)
The Spy Who Loved Me (film)
Cold War video games
Video games developed in the United States